Forward Operating Base (FOB) Ghazni is a former forward operating base operated by the International Security Assistance Force (ISAF) located in Ghazni Province, Afghanistan. The base housed members of the United States Armed Forces and the Afghan National Police.

Deployed units

 Task Force White Eagle (-2014)

See also 

 List of NATO installations in Afghanistan
 List of Afghan Armed Forces installations

References 

Military bases of Poland in Afghanistan
Military installations of the United States in Afghanistan